The kingdoms of Bahrain and Thailand share bilateral relations, established diplomatically in 1972.

History
Thailand and Bahrain first established relations in 1972, a year following the independence of the Gulf Arab nation from the United Kingdom. Historically, Bahrain and Thailand shared mutual common of historical civilizations developed in both countries. Since 15th century, Arab traders, including those from the Gulf nations, began establishing its foothold in then-Siam, the old name of Thailand, and the link between Thailand to many Arab nations, notably the Gulf where majority came from, including Bahrain, continues to even today.

Today
Since 1990s, Thailand and Bahrain signed a major framework on economic cooperation, thus effectively making them important economic partners. Today, Thailand is a major investor in Bahrain.

In March 2019, Bahraini Prime Minister and Prince Khalifa bin Salman Al Khalifa, during his participation in the Thai Culture and Food Festival held in capital Manama, praised Thailand and expressed wish to promote the relations.

The latest new business venture between the two countries is a new  Thai shopping centre in Manama, set to launch in the first half of 2019 and described as an opportunity for Thai small and medium-sized enterprises to reach a huge potential market of Saudi shoppers, said to be the biggest economic centre in Bahrain, with import and exports between the two countries expected to be worth around US$400m annually. On November the same year, Thai Mart, Thailand's largest chain store, officially opened its supermarket in Bahrain to boost the relations.

Economic cooperation between Thailand and Bahrain also experienced significant rise, as both are commonly monarchies. Thai Deputy Prime Minister and Minister of Foreign Affairs Surapong Tovichakchaikul had said in 2012 that the relationship between Thailand and Bahrain "was very close and strong" and also disclosed Bahrain Prime Minister was a "close personal friend" of former Thai prime minister Thaksin Shinawatra and had "donated roughly $2 million of his own money" to Thailand for flood relief.

Tourism
The Al-Khalifa family has a close tie to the Chakri dynasty and members of Bahraini Royal Family frequently tour Thailand for tourist purposes.

In August 2019, Thailand launched its first online health tourism in Bahrain.

Hakeem al-Araibi's arrest
In 2013, Bahraini footballer Hakeem al-Araibi fled the country, and arrived in Australia after traveling to Thailand, where he was granted refugee status in response to repressive methods by the government on Bahraini protesters and tortures on him. However, in November 2018, Hakeem was arrested in Bangkok, Thailand at the request of Bahraini authorities.

The arrest of Hakeem in Thailand and accusation of Thai economic interests within Bahrain had led to uproar and protest against the Thai authorities over alleged maltreatment over a political refugee. On 11 February 2019, it was announced by the Thai Office of the Attorney-General (OAG) that the extradition case against Al-Araibi had been dropped by the criminal court at Bahrain's request after pressures from Australia, human rights groups like Amnesty International and FIFA. No reason was given by the foreign ministry, but the decision was made under Section 21 of the Prosecution Act, which allows for cases to be dropped if not in the public interest, and he would be released and allowed to return to Australia as soon as possible.

References

External links
Royal Thai embassy in Manama, Bahrain

Thailand
Bahrain